William Branwhite Clarke, FRS (2 June 179816 June 1878) was an English geologist and clergyman, active in Australia.

Early life and England
Clarke was born at East Bergholt, in Suffolk, the eldest child of William Clarke, schoolmaster, and his wife Sarah, née Branwhite.  He was partly educated at his father's house, under the Rev. R. G. S. Brown, B.D., and partly at Dedham Grammar School.  In October 1817 he went to Cambridge and entered into residence at Jesus College.  In 1819 he entered a poem for the Chancellor's Gold Medal; this was awarded to Macaulay, but Clarke's poem Pompeii, published in the same year, was judged second. He took his BA degree in 1821, and obtained his MA degree in 1824.  In 1821 he was appointed curate of Ramsholt in Suffolk, and he acted in his clerical capacity in other places until 1839. He was also master of the Free School of East Bergholt for about 18 months in 1830–1. Having become interested in geology through the teachings of Adam Sedgwick, he used his opportunities and gathered many interesting facts on the geology of East Anglia which were embodied in a paper On the Geological Structure and Phenomena of Suffolk (Trans. Geol. Soc. 1837).  He also communicated a series of papers on the geology of S.E. to the Magazine of Nat. Hist. (1837–1838).

Career in Australia
In 1839, after a severe illness, Clarke left England for New South Wales, mainly with the object of benefiting by the sea voyage.  He had been commissioned by some of his English colleagues to ascertain the extent and character of the carboniferous formation in New South Wales (Clarke's letter to Sydney Morning Herald, 18 February 1852). He remained, however, in that country, and came to be regarded as the Father of Australian Geology.

Clarke was headmaster of The King's School, Parramatta, in May 1839 until the end of 1840.  Until 1870 he ministered to parishes from Parramatta to the Hawkesbury River, then of Campbelltown, and finally of Willoughby. He zealously devoted attention to the geology of the country, with results that have been of paramount importance. In 1841 he found specimens of gold, but he was not the first European who had obtained it in situ in the country. (This honour goes correctly to Government Surveyor James McBrien who found flakes at Locksley NSW in February 1823). Clarke described finding it both in the detrital deposits and in the quartz reefs west of the Blue Mountains, the same area where McBrien had found it, and he declared his belief in its abundance.  Mr R Lowe, Lieutenant William Lawson, an unnamed convict (who was flogged for the discovery), Dr Johann Lhotsky, and "Count" Paul Strzelecki had also found gold in Australia before Clarke.  It appears they mostly had found alluvial flakes, whereas Clarke had found it embedded in quartz rocks. Early in 1844 he showed the governor of New South Wales, Sir George Gipps, some specimens of gold he had found. Sir George asked him where he had got it, and when Clarke told him said "Put it away or we shall have our throats cut". Clarke, in his evidence before the select committee on his claims, which sat in 1861, stated that he knew of the existence of the gold in 1841. Clarke, however, agreed with Gipps that it may not be wise to announce the presence of gold in the colony. Clarke continued his clerical duties, but was occasionally lent to the government to carry out geological investigations. In 1849 he made the first discovery of tin in Australia and in 1859 he made known the occurrence of diamonds.  He discovered secondary (Cretaceous) fossils in Queensland in 1860, he was also the first to indicate the presence of Silurian rocks, and to determine the age of the coal-bearing rocks in New South Wales.  In 1869 he announced the discovery of remains of Dinornis in Queensland. He finished the preparation of the fourth edition of his Remarks on the Sedimentary Formations of New South Wales on his eightieth birthday, and died a fortnight later on 16 June 1878.  He was buried in the St Thomas cemetery, the graveyard of the North Shore church he was rector of for many years; and his widow and some descendants and relatives are close by.

Legacy

Clarke was a trustee of the Australian Museum at Sydney, and an active member of the Royal Society of New South Wales of which he was vice-president 1866–1878; the Clarke Medal awarded by the Society is named in his honour.  In 1860 he published Researches in the Southern Gold Fields of New South Wales.  He was elected Fellow of the Royal Society in 1876, and in the following year was awarded the Murchison Medal by the Geological Society of London.  His contributions to Australian scientific journals were numerous. He died near Sydney.  His name is commemorated in the William Clarke College school at Kellyville, NSW and the WB Clarke Geoscience Centre at Londonderry, NSW operated by the Geological Survey of New South Wales.

His works in geology included the field of palaeontology and his collections and receipt of fossil material formed the foundation of research on Australia's extinct flora and fauna. Clarke did not describe the specimens he avidly collected throughout his life, these were instead forwarded to societies in England for their scientific examination. The results of his contemporaries studies and descriptions of Australian palaeontology and geology were incorporated into his own publications, and he remained current with advances in these fields despite his remote location.

See also 
Australian gold rushes
William Clarke College

Footnotes

References
 
 Clarke, William Branwhite (1871), "Ceratodus Forsteri" (a poem), pp.89-90 in Intercolonial Exhibition , The Industrial Progress of New South Wales: Being a Report of the Intercolonial Exhibition of 1870, at Sydney; Together with a Variety of Papers Illustrative of the Industrial Resources of the Colony, Sydney: Thomas Richards, Government Printer.
 
Ann Mozley, 'Clarke, William Branwhite (1798–1878)', Australian Dictionary of Biography, Volume 3, MUP, 1969, pp 420–422.

External links 

1798 births
1878 deaths
People from East Bergholt
Alumni of Jesus College, Cambridge
19th-century English Anglican priests
English geologists
Australian Anglican priests
Australian geologists
Fellows of the Royal Society
Australian people of English descent
19th-century Australian scientists